Timothy Charles Simons (born June 12, 1978) is an American actor and comedian best known for his role as Jonah Ryan on the HBO television series Veep, for which he has received five nominations and one win for the Screen Actors Guild Award for Outstanding Performance by an Ensemble in a Comedy Series. He has also had acting roles in the films The Interview, Christine, and The Boss.

Early and personal life
Simons was raised in Readfield, Maine, the son of Susan and Ron Simons, and graduated from Maranacook Community High School in 1996. He graduated from the University of Maine in 2001. Simons is married to Annie Simons and they have two children together.

Filmography

References

External links
 

1978 births
21st-century American male actors
American male film actors
American male television actors
American male voice actors
Living people
Male actors from Maine
People from Readfield, Maine
University of Maine alumni